Baires Fly is an airline based in Buenos Aires, Argentina. It was established on May 30, 1996, and operates passenger and cargo charter services. Its main base is Aeroparque Jorge Newbery in Buenos Aires.

Fleet
The Baires Fly fleet consists of the following aircraft (at September 2020):
2 Bombardier Learjet 35
4 Bombardier Learjet 60
2 Fairchild Metro III
1 Gulfstream V

Former fleet 
3 Bombardier Learjet 45

References

External links
Company website 
Company website 

Airlines of Argentina
Airlines established in 1996
Argentine companies established in 1996